Ghalleh Zaghesi (also Romanized as Ghalleh Zāghesī) is a village in Chaybasar-e Jonubi Rural District, in the Central District of Maku County, West Azerbaijan Province, Iran. At the 2006 census, its population was 338, in 56 families.

References 

Populated places in Maku County